Timoshinskaya is a rural locality (a village) in Kargopolsky District, Arkhangelsk Oblast, Russia. The population was 7 as of 2012. There are 2 streets.

Geography 
Timoshinskaya is located 39 km south of Kargopol (the district's administrative centre) by road. Belaya is the nearest rural locality.

References 

Rural localities in Kargopolsky District